Frank Edward Clarke may refer to:

 Frank Edward Clarke (British politician) (1886–1938), politician in England
 Frank Edward Clarke (ichthyologist) (1849–1899), New Zealand ichthyologist and scientific illustrator